Siniša Dobrašinović (Cyrillic: Синиша Добрашиновић, born 17 February 1977) is a retired Montenegrin-born Cypriot footballer, who played as a defensive midfielder and now works as a football manager.

Playing career

Club
Dobrašinović started his career playing for FK Rudar Pljevlja, and made his first attempt abroad at K.S.C. Lokeren. He later tried his luck at Cyprus, which was a crucial decision, since spent most his career playing at the Cyprus First Division.

He played in various Cypriot teams, but his best years was playing for AC Omonia and Anorthosis. While playing at Anorthosis in the Champions League, became the first player to score in a Cypriot kit.

In his later years as footballer he played at Greek club AO Kavala. and FC Zhetysu of Kazakhstan.

International

Despite being born in Ivangrad, SR Montenegro, then part of SFR Yugoslavia, Dobrasinović has opted to accept the call to represent the Cypriot national team. He was playing in Cyprus since 2000, and in 2009 took the Cypriot citizenship. He made his debut for Cyprus on 10 October 2009 against Bulgaria in a 4–1 win and has earned a total of 28 caps, scoring 1 goal. His final international was a May 2014 Kirin Cup match against hosts Japan.

International appearances 

*International Football Career History:

2009-2014 National Team of Cyprus 29 games and 1 goal.

*Team Honors:

-Apollon F.C.: Winner of Cypriot Cup 2001

-Digenis Morphou F.C.: First time in history of Digenis F.C. the team played in the Cypriot Cup Final in 2004.

-F.C. Omonoia: Winners of Cypriot Super Cup 2005.

-Anorthosis F.C.: First time in history of Cypriot Football a team is qualified in the group stage of Champions League in 2008.

-Nea Salamina F.C.: The team broke the record in the history of Nea Salamina F.C. with 17 wins in one season (2013).

*Individual Honors:

-Scored the first goal of a Cypriot team in Champions League group stage against Panathinaikos F.C. (opening game) in 2008.

-Chosen in best eleven (11) team for Champions League in October 2008.

-Last minutes of rich professional football career finished as the captain of National Football Team of Cyprus against Japan in Tokyo (27/05/2014).

International goals
Scores and results list Cyprus's goal tally first

Managerial career

By the end of the season 2013/14 Dobrašinović decided to put an end to his career as player and become a manager. On 23 January 2015, he was announced as first manager for Aris Thessaloniki. Later, in 2017 he was an assistant coach in the Cypriot National Team until 2019. In 2021, he coached F.C.Ermis.

Honours
Apollon
 Cypriot Cup: 2001

Omonia
 Cypriot Cup: 2005
 Cyprus FA Shield: 2005

Anorthosis
Cypriot Championship: 2008

Statistics

Champions League 2008/2009

Scores and results list 2008–09 UEFA Champions League's goal tally first

References

 http://www.uefa.com/uefachampionsleague/season=2009/matches/round=15276/match=302707/postmatch/report/index.html

 https://archive.today/20130616052422/http://www.anorthosis.com/interviews.php?InterviewID=10

 http://www.sigmalive.com/sports/football/cyprus/a+league/158841

 http://www.anorthosis.com/news.php?ArticleID=190

 http://www.enet.gr/?i=news.el.a8lhtismos&id=147148

 http://www.sigmalive.com/simerini/sport+time/cyprus/159022

 https://archive.today/20130616052520/http://www.shootandgoal.com/page.php?bid=8&id=39630

 https://web.archive.org/web/20090916063325/http://www.protathlima.com/content/league/story.jsp?league_id=1&id=38038

 http://www.sport-fm.gr/article/197516

 http://www.shootandgoal.com/page.php?bid=2&id=13102

 http://www.inews.gr/17/premiera-gia-ntobrasinovits.htm

 https://web.archive.org/web/20100104050223/http://www.politis-sports.com/cgibin/hweb?-A=53720&-V=onlinenews

 http://www.sigmalive.com/simerini/sport+time/columns/kyriakatika/302136

 https://archive.today/20130616052432/http://sports.pathfinder.gr/football/mundial-2010/779147.html

 http://www.kathimerini.com.cy/index.php?pageaction=kat&modid=1&artid=7233

 

 http://www.alkifc.com.cy/index.php?option=com_content&view=article&id=405%3A2011-02-02-12-12-51&catid=1%3Alatest-news&Itemid=61&lang=el

 http://www.sigmalive.com/sports/football/cyprus/a+league/349637

 http://newshopper.sulekha.com/portugal-cyprus-euro-2012-soccer_photo_1493938.htm

 https://web.archive.org/web/20090708130012/http://www.protathlima.com/content/league/story.jsp?league_id=1&id=36365

 https://archive.today/20130616081045/http://www.anorthosis.com/news.php?ArticleID=821

 http://anorthosis24.net/2013/07/otan-i-anorthosi-egrapse-istoria/

 https://web.archive.org/web/20140129055546/http://red1948.com/football/news/509-panagia-goalara-dobrasinovits

 https://balla.com.cy/2021/05/09/ntompra-pio-statheri-i-omonoia-atakes-gia-ael-kai-apollon/

 https://balla.com.cy/2021/05/09/ntompra-megalo-endiaferon-gia-tin-machi-tis-paramonis/

 https://balla.com.cy/2021/05/09/ntomprasinovits-sto-balla-axia-protathlitria-i-omonoia-ti-eipe-gia-ton-teliko/

 https://balla.com.cy/2021/05/09/ntompra-favori-ston-teliko-o-olympiakos/

 https://balla.com.cy/2021/04/06/ntompra-den-axizan-na-kerdisoyn/

 https://www.kerkida.net/eidiseis/a-katigoria/ethnikos-ahnas/ntompra-vs-ilias-sto-ammohostos

 https://www.kerkida.net/eidiseis/alles-stiles/koys-koys/ermis/dynata-o-sinisa

 https://www.kerkida.net/eidiseis/alles-stiles/koys-koys/ermis/i-1i-toy-ntompra

 https://protathlima.cyprustimes.com/podosfairo/kypros/a-katigoria/ermis-aradippoy/ntomprasinovits-oles-oi-omades-einai-konta-kai-mechri-to-telos-tha-ginei-machi/

 https://sportime.sigmalive.com/podosfairo/kypros/a-katigoria/166273_ntempoyto-ntomprasinovits

 https://www.kerkida.net/eidiseis/a-katigoria/ermis/ntompra-eimai-pente-meres-me-ayta-ta-paidia-alla

 https://www.kerkida.net/eidiseis/a-katigoria/ermis/ntempoyto-gia-ntompra

 https://www.kerkida.net/eidiseis/a-katigoria/ermis/i-proti-kinisi-toy-ntompra

 https://www.kerkida.net/eidiseis/a-katigoria/ermis/symfonia-me-ntomprasinobits

 https://www.kerkida.net/eidiseis/a-katigoria/ermis/fanieros-gia-ntompra-milisame-deka-lepta-kai-katalaba

 https://www.kerkida.net/eidiseis/a-katigoria/ermis/deal-super-monday-me-loyka-faniero

 https://balla.com.cy/2021/03/09/dikaioytai-4/

External links
 

1977 births
Living people
People from Berane
Cypriot footballers
Cyprus international footballers
Montenegrin footballers
Serbia and Montenegro footballers
Montenegrin emigrants to Cyprus
Cypriot people of Montenegrin descent
Cypriot people of Serbian descent
Montenegrin people of Serbian descent
Association football midfielders
FK Rudar Pljevlja players
K.S.C. Lokeren Oost-Vlaanderen players
Apollon Limassol FC players
NK Ivančna Gorica players
Digenis Akritas Morphou FC players
AC Omonia players
Anorthosis Famagusta F.C. players
Kavala F.C. players
Alki Larnaca FC players
FC Zhetysu players
Nea Salamis Famagusta FC players
First League of Serbia and Montenegro players
Second League of Serbia and Montenegro players
Belgian Pro League players
Cypriot First Division players
Slovenian Second League players
Super League Greece players
Kazakhstan Premier League players
Serbia and Montenegro expatriate footballers
Expatriate footballers in Belgium
Serbia and Montenegro expatriate sportspeople in Belgium
Expatriate footballers in Cyprus
Serbia and Montenegro expatriate sportspeople in Cyprus
Expatriate footballers in Slovenia
Serbia and Montenegro expatriate sportspeople in Slovenia
Montenegrin expatriate footballers
Montenegrin expatriate sportspeople in Cyprus
Expatriate footballers in Greece
Montenegrin expatriate sportspeople in Greece
Expatriate footballers in Kazakhstan
Montenegrin expatriate sportspeople in Kazakhstan
Montenegrin football managers
Cypriot football managers
Aris Thessaloniki F.C. managers
Expatriate football managers in Greece
Cypriot expatriate football managers